Iran (Persia) has had numerous capital cities and royal centers throughout its history.

Ahar; Pishkinid dynasty
Anshan; pre-Achaemenid era
Ardabil; early Safavid era, Sajid
Asaak; Parthian era royal center
Astara; Ispahbads of Gilan
Alamut Castle; Nizari Ismaili state
Amol; Ziyarid, Alavid, Marashis, Dabuyid, Bavandid, Chalavi, (Parthian Empire climate capital)
Babylon; Achaemenid era
Baghdad; caliphates, Jalayerid, Buyid
Bardsir; Banu Ilyas
Basra; Jalayerid
Bukhara; Samanid era
Ctesiphon; Parthian, Sassanid era
Damavand; Masmughans of Damavand
Dinavar; Hasanwayhids
Diyarbakır; Aq Qoyunlu
Fuman; Dabuyid
Farim (Perim); Bavandid
Firozkoh; Ghurid
Firuzkuh; Chalavi
Shahr-e Qumis (Hecatompylos); Parthian era
Ghazna; Ghurid, Khwarazmid, Ghaznavid
Gor (Firuzabad); Sassanid era
Gorgan (Astarabad); Ziyarid, Alavids
Herat; Ghurid, Kartids, Timurid Empire
Hulwan; Annazids
Ij (Ig); Shabankara
Isfahan; Ziyarid dynasty, Kakuyid Emirate, Injuid dynasty, Seljuk era, Safavid era
Istakhr; Sassanian era
Izeh (Idaj); Hazaraspids
Ecbatana (later Hamadan); Median Empire, Achaemenid era, Eldiguzids, Seljuks (Greater and Iraq Seljuks)
Kerman; Muzaffarid, Qutlugh-Khanids
Khorramabad; Khorshidi dynasty
Kunya Urgench; early Khwarezmid era
Lafur; Qarinvand dynasty
Lankaran; Talysh Khanate
Lahijan; Karkiya dynasty
Maragheh; Ilkhanid, Ahmadilis, Sajid
Mashhad; Afsharid
Merv; capital during al-Mamun's caliphate, and Taherid era, Seljuk Empire
Mosul; winter capital during Qara Qoyunlu 
Nakhchivan; Eldiguzids
Nishapur; Ilkhanid, Seljuq, Taherid eras
Nisa, Turkmenistan; periodical capital of the Parthian era
Pasargadae; Achaemenid
Persepolis; Achaemenid grand capital
Rey (Rhagae); Median, Ziyarid, Buyid, Seljuk Empire
Rudbar; Justanids
Qazvin; early Safavid era
Sabzevar; Sarbadars
Samarkand; Samanid, Khwarazmid, Timurid era
Shiraz; Buyid dynasty, Injuid dynasty, Muzaffarid dynasty, Salghurid dynasty, Zand dynasty
Soltaniyeh; Ilkhanid
Susa; Achaemenid, Parthian era
Tabriz; Ilkhanid, Khwarezmid, Rawadid, Chupanid, Jalayerid, Eldiguzids, Kara Koyunlu, Aq Qoyunlu, early Safavid era
Tarom; Sallarid
Sari; Qajar, Dabuyid, Alavid, Bavandid, Marashis
Yazd; Kakuyid, Atabegs of Yazd
Zaranj; Saffarid Empire, Mihrabanid, Nasrid
Tehran; Qajar Empire, Pahlavi Dynasty, Islamic Republic of Iran 1796–present

See also
Iran
Ancient Iran
Afghanistan

External links 
 Capital cities in Encyclopedia Iranica

Geographic history of Iran